Kalavani 2 is a 2019 Indian Tamil-language romantic comedy film directed and produced by A. Sarkunam. The film stars Vimal and Oviya, with RJ Vigneshkanth amongst others in supporting roles. A sequel to Kalavani (2010), the film began production in February 2018. The film was released on 5 July 2019 to negative reviews.

Plot
Arivazhagan (Vimal) continues his fraudulent existence with a new friend Vicky (RJ Vigneshkanth) in tow.  When the Panchayat elections are announced Arivazhagan 's uncle and his lover Maheswari (Oviya) father are contesting for the Local body elections. The Kalavani plans to file nomination on his own hoping that either side would pay him off to avoid splitting of votes and cheats Panchayat (Ganja Karuppu) to finance this scheme.

Cast

Vimal as Arivazhagan (Arikki) / A. M. R.
Oviya as Maheshwari (Mahesh) Arivazhagan
RJ Vigneshkanth as Vicky
Saranya Ponvannan as  Lakshmi
Durai Sudhakar as Rajendran (A) Raavana
Ilavarasu as Annamalai
Ganja Karuppu as Panchayathu
Villain Raj as Chelladurai, Maheshwari's father
Senthi Kumari as Mrs. Chelladurai, Maheshwari's mother
Vinodhini Vaidyanathan as Manimekalai Rajendran
Mayilsamy as Chinnasaamy (Thosai)
Imman Annachi as Nallathambi
TSR as Election Commissioner
Usha Elizabeth as Chinnasaamy's wife
Shanthi Mani
Sindhiya as Maheshwari's friend
Mannai Sathik as Maheswari's blackmailer
Kannayiram

Production
Upon release in 2010, Kalavani, produced by Nazir, had become a surprise success and performed well at the box office, effectively making the careers of director Sarkunam, actor Vimal and actress Oviya. In November 2016, reports emerged that Sarkunam and Vimal were coming together for a sequel but Sarkunam continued to concentrate on the pre-production of a film starring Madhavan. In October 2017, Vimal denied signing the film and dispelled reports that a sequel was in production for producer Nazir.

In a turn of events in February 2018, Sarkunam shelved his proposed film with Madhavan and announced that he would make a sequel to Kalavani. He launched his own production house, Varmans Productions, to fund the film and cast Vimal Oviya, while titling the project as K2. Soon after Sarkunam's announcement, Nazir revealed that he was unhappy at this proposal, and that he would begin work on a separate film titled Kalavani 2 as he had the original rights to the title. He suggested that production would begin in mid-2018 after he had finished making a film titled Vadam with Poonam Kaur.

Despite the ongoing issue, Sarkunam began shooting the film with Vimal in February 2018, with Oviya joining the team in May 2018. Several members of the original film's cast joined the project, except Soori, with Vigneshkanth signed on instead.

References

External links
 
 https://timesofindia.com/entertainment/tamil/movie-reviews/kalavani-2/amp_movie_review/70103766.cms

2010s Tamil-language films
Indian romantic comedy films
2019 romantic comedy films
Indian sequel films
2019 films
Films directed by A. Sarkunam